Lister Petter is a British company that manufactures internal combustion engines for industry, a subsidiary of Teignmouth, England based Sleeman and Hawken.

History
The company was formed in 1986, after owner Hawker Siddeley Group Plc merged Dursley, Gloucestershire based R A Lister and Company (acquired in 1965), with Yeovil, Somerset based Petters Limited (acquired in 1957).

In 1992, Hawker Siddeley Group Plc was acquired by BTR plc for £1.5bn. In 1999 BTR merged with Siebe to form BTR Siebe plc, which was renamed Invensys plc. In preparation, BTR sold any subsidiary operations, including Lister-Petter in 1996 to Schroders Venture Capital.

In 2000, with Schroders looking to exit, the firm was bought through a £13.5M management buyout, enabled through selling the original Lister factory site to the South West Regional Development Agency. By this time, the core engine products were in demise, and the company employed around 250 people on a turnover of £35M. Cost-cutting measures included closing the award-winning foundry in 2001: it had been one of the most advanced in Europe when it opened in 1937. In 2003, the company fell into its first administration.

Products
Both companies produced a range of small diesel engines, ranging from single-cylinder water-cooled engines of 2.7 horsepower (the 'Zeta' series) up to the  'Delta' engine. The engine designs range from more recent design high-speed turbodiesels (such as the 'Gamma' or 'Omega' engines) to traditional single-cylinder medium-speed types such as the 'A-Series' and 'Phi' types.

Applications
Lister Petter engines are generally used in stationary industrial applications such as pumping and electricity generation.  The company produces a range of complete generator sets, units equipped for welding and in-house pumping sets, as well as supplying engines to other equipment manufacturers.  L-P engines are widely exported, especially for use in irrigation projects. The company also maintains a long tradition (of both its founder companies) in supplying engines for marine applications both as prime mover engines for small vessels and as auxiliary power units in larger ones.

Gas-fuelled engines
Lister Petter's main product, the 'Alpha' series of sub-2-litre engines, is also available in spark ignition forms for running on natural gas or propane. L-P also manufactures and sells biodiesel plants, allowing customers to produce their own fuel for diesel engines.

History
 1867 R A Lister company founded by Robert Ashton Lister.
 1893 James B Petter & Sons founded.
 1895 First oil engines made by Petters.
 1910 Petters Ltd founded.
 1929 First diesel engines produced by R A Lister in Dursley.
 1960s/1970s peak employment of over 5,000
 1986 R A Lister and Petters Ltd merged to form Lister Petter Ltd.
 2004/2005 Lister Petter sees unprecedented growth and re-investment in its core products
 2013 Goes into administration
 2014 moves operations to former RAF Aston Down site, saves 80 jobs

Lister and Petter engines were workhorses of the British Commonwealth; many of these engines are still in use today in dump trucks, generators and water pumps. They generally, but not exclusively, leave the factory in a Mid Brunswick Green colouring.

Locations
The company's headquarters and manufacturing facility until 2013 were in Dursley, Gloucestershire, formerly the headquarters of R A Lister and Company. After the company fell into administration in late 2013, the assets were bought by EGL Group of Birmingham. The headquarters had already moved to Hardwicke, and the operations were then moved to the former RAF Aston Down. The company also manufactured diesel engines at their factory at Wroughton, near Swindon, Wiltshire until its closure in 1992.  The factory, which been purchased from the Admiralty in 1946 and had originally produced marine gun mountings during World War 2, was still known locally as Marine Mountings.

Lister Petter have agents in France, the United States, China and India, which market their products and carry out final assembly of larger items such as generating sets from imported parts.

References

External links

 Lister Petter website

Manufacturing companies established in 1986
Companies based in Gloucestershire
Engine manufacturers of the United Kingdom
Electrical generation engine manufacturers
Diesel engine manufacturers
1986 establishments in England
Petter